Obolonsky (masculine), Obolonskaya (feminine) is a Russian-language surname, see "Blonsky" for its etymology. Notable people with this surname include:

 (1856-1913), Ukrainian (Russian Empire) professor of  legal medicine, dean of the medical department, Kiev University
Raisa Obolonsky (1924-2010), Russian writer
Shane Obolonsky, Canadian kickboxer

See also
Mirosław Obłoński
Oblonsky

Russian-language surnames